Miss World Spain 2014 was the 2nd edition of the Miss World Spain pageant, held on September 13, 2014. The winner was Lourdes Rodríguez of Castilla-La Mancha and she represented Spain in Miss World 2014.

Final results

Special Awards

Official delegates

Notes

Returns
Last competed in 2011:
 Asturias
 Barcelona
 Cádiz
 Cantabria
 Jaén

Withdrawals
 Catalonia
 Granada

Did not compete
 Almería
 Araba
 Ávila
 Badajoz
 Burgos
 Cáceres
 Castile and León
 Ciudad Real
 Cuenca
 Ceuta
 Gerona
 Guadalajara
 Guipúzcoa
 Huesca
 La Coruña
 La Rioja
 León
 Lérida
 Lugo
 Navarre
 Orense
 Pontevedra
 Salamanca
 Soria
 Tarragona
 Teruel
 Toledo
 Valladolid
 Vizcaya
 Zamora
 Zaragoza

References

External links

Miss Spain
2014 in Spain
2014 beauty pageants